Naked Woman Climbing a Staircase (originally in French Femme nue montant l'escalier) is a drawing done with pencil and charcoal on card made by Joan Miró in 1937. It is part of the permanent collection of the Fundació Joan Miró in Barcelona.

History 

Miró created Naked Woman Climbing a Staircase during the Spanish Civil War. He was living in Paris when he started to attend life drawing classes at the school of the Grande Chaumiere. Miró returned to constructing the human figure to represent the drama that was then taking place in Catalonia. This feeling can be made out in the shapes used to draw this tortured nude woman climbing a staircase. Other works of this period include Still Life with Old Shoe and Aidez l'Espagne.

Description 

According to the Joan Miró Foundation, "Miró's despondency brought about by the moral tragedy of the war can be seen in the violent metamorphosis of the figure, in her heavy limbs and in the effort involved in climbing." At the top right is a kind of window or box where light rays can be seen entering the room. The woman is using her right arm to try to grab a ladder – this was a symbol that Miró used in several of his works to represent evasion or escape. The external genitals of the woman are similar to those of the woman in Man and Woman in Front of a Pile of Excrement as they are exaggerated in size. This work is said to be related to Marcel Duchamp's 1912 painting Nude Descending a Staircase, No. 2, although here the woman is ascending. The distortion and effort of the figure are interpreted as mirroring the Spanish Civil War. Duchamp's painting was not original; it alluded to the earlier photographs by Eadweard Muybridge which were amongst the first to record animal locomotion. Miró first saw this work by Duchamp in 1912, during the Cubist art exhibition held at Galeries Dalmau in Barcelona.

Muybridge's idea of a woman on a staircase caught the imagination of not only Duchamp and Miró but also Miró's contemporary Salvador Dalí who created a homage to Duchamp's painting. His model was also shown ascending the stairs like Miró's subject.

Exhibitions

2011 exhibition
The exhibition L'escala de l'evasió that opened in October 2011 was supported by access to Wikipedia using QRpedia codes that allowed access to visitors in Catalan, English and several other languages.

Notes

References 
 
 
 Jaques Dupin – Ariane Lelong-Mainaud. Joan Miró. Catalogue raisonné. Drawings I 1901–1937, 2008. Daniel Lelong and Successió Miró

1937 works
Spanish art
Arts in Spain
Paintings in Barcelona
Joan Miró